Carnitine O-palmitoyltransferase (also called carnitine palmitoyltransferase) is a mitochondrial transferase enzyme involved in the metabolism of palmitoylcarnitine into palmitoyl-CoA. A related transferase is carnitine acyltransferase.

Molecules

Pathway

Human forms
There are four different forms of CPT in humans:

 CPT1A – associated with Carnitine palmitoyltransferase I deficiency
 CPT1B
 CPT1C
 CPT2 – associated with carnitine palmitoyltransferase II deficiency

See also

References

External links
  – Acyltransferases ChoActase / COT / CPT family in PROSITE
 Choline/Carnitine o-acyltransferase family in Pfam
 
 

Integral membrane proteins
EC 2.3.1